Marie Angel may refer to:
 Marie Angel (soprano) (born 1953), Australian opera singer
 Marie Angel (artist) (1923–2010), British illustrator and calligrapher